is a station in Kita-ku, Kyoto, Japan, operated by Keifuku Electric Railroad. It has two bay platform tracks.

History 

Kitano-Hakubaicho Station began operations on October 1, 1943, under the name Hakubaicho Station. The Randen Kitano Line, which this station serves,  opened in 1925 between Takaoguchi Station (the current Utano Station) and Kitano (near Kitano Tenmangu Shrine, no longer in operation). The opening of the Kyoto City Tram Nishioji Line resulted in the construction of Hakubaicho Station to serve as a transfer station. However, when the portion between Kitano and Hakubaicho closed, Hakubaicho station was renamed Kitano-Hakubaicho and from then on served as the terminal station for the Kitano Line. The Nishioji Line closed in 1978 when the city ended all operations of the Kyoto City Tram.

Lines 
Kitano-Hakubaichō Station is served by the Randen Kitano Line. The station also served the Kyoto City Tram Nishioji Line from 1943 to 1978.

Adjacent stations

Operations are normally limited to usage of Track 1 only. Passenger boarding is from the middle platform and unloading is from the two side platforms. The station is staffed from 6am ~ 6pm, and remains unstaffed during the rest of the day.

Surrounding area
 Kitano Tenmangū Shrine
 Hirano Shrine
Shikichi Shrine (Waratenjin)
Taishogun-Hachi Shrine
Rakusei Middle School and High School

References

External links

 Randen - Keifuku Electric Railroad

Stations of Keifuku Electric Railroad
Railway stations in Japan opened in 1925